Uncle G may refer to:
Uncle Grandpa, an American television series on Cartoon Network
 Randy Gelispie, aka. Uncle G, a jazz musician and educator
 Gerald "Uncle G" Dowd, a member of Lick (band)